The Crown Artillery Regiment was an artillery regiment of the Royal Danish Army. On 1 August 1982 it was merged with the Zealand Artillery Regiment to form the King's Artillery Regiment.

History
In 1684 three artillery corps were formed, Danske Artillerikorps, Holstenske Artillerikorps and Norske Artillerikorps. They were merged in 1764 to one corps, Det kongelige Artillerikorps. Kronens Artilleriregiment traces its origin back to this corps. In 1803 it was split up into three brigades, Danske Artilleribrigade, Holstenske Artilleribrigade (the later Zealand Artillery Regiment) and Norske Artilleribrigade (disbanded in 1814).

Unit
  1st Armoured Artillery Battalion (1961-1982)
  2nd Artillery Battalion (1961-1982)
  14th Light Artillery Battalion (1961-1982)
  16th Light Artillery Battalion (1974-1982)

  1st Anti Air Artillery Battalion (1970-1974)
  13th Anti Air Artillery Battalion (1970-1982)

Names of the regiment

References
 Lærebog for Hærens Menige, Hærkommandoen, March 1960

Artillery regiments of Denmark
Military units and formations established in 1764